Teng Haiqing (March 2, 1909 – October 26, 1997) was a Chinese military officer and a politician. He was in charge of the massive purge in the Inner Mongolia incident.

Early life 
Teng was born in Jinzhai County, Anhui province, China.

Career 
Teng was a People's Liberation Army lieutenant general and People's Republic of China politician. He was Communist Party of China Committee Secretary and Chairman of Inner Mongolia.

1909 births
1997 deaths
People's Liberation Army generals from Anhui
People's Republic of China politicians from Anhui
Chinese Communist Party politicians from Anhui
Political office-holders in Inner Mongolia
People from Jinzhai County
Politicians from Lu'an
Genocide perpetrators
Persecution of Mongols